Kotków may refer to the following places:
Kotków, Łęczyca County in Łódź Voivodeship (central Poland)
Kotków, Piotrków County in Łódź Voivodeship (central Poland)
Kotków, Gliwice County in Silesian Voivodeship (south Poland)